Séverine Pont-Combe (born 28 June 1979)  is a Swiss ski mountaineer and long-distance runner. She was born in Meyrin. She currently lives in Bernex.

Selected results

Ski mountaineering 
 2003:
 1st, Zermatt-Rothorn run
 2005:
 2nd, Swiss Cup team (together with Jeanine Bapst)
 4th, European Championship team race (together with Andréa Zimmermann)
 5th, European Championship single race
 8th, European Championship vertical race
 2006:
 1st, Swiss Championship vertical race
 1st, Trophée des Gastlosen, together with Catherine Mabillard
 3rd, World Championship team race (together with Catherine Mabillard)
 2008:
 1st, World Championship relay race (together with Marie Troillet, Nathalie Etzensperger and Gabrielle Magnenat)
 2nd, World Championship team race (together with Nathalie Etzensperger)
 6th, World Championship single race
 9th, World Championship combination ranking
 2009:
 2nd, European Championship relay race (together with Nathalie Etzensperger and Gabrielle Magnenat)
 10th, European Championship single race
 1st, Trophée des Gastlosen, together with Natalie Etzensperger
 2011:
 3rd, World Championship team race (together with Gabrielle Gachet, née Magnenat)
 5th, World Championship vertical race
 7th, World Championship vertical, combined ranking
 2012:
 1st, European Championship team, together with Marie Troillet
 1st, European Championship relay, together with Émilie Gex-Fabry and Mireille Richard
 1st, World Championship vertical, combined ranking
 2nd, European Championship sprint
 3rd, European Championship single
 5th, European Championship vertical race
 1st, Patrouille de la Maya, together with Laëtitia Roux and Mireia Miró Varela

Patrouille des Glaciers 

 2006: 1st and course record, together with Catherine Mabillard and Gabrielle Magnenat
 2008: 1st and course record, together with Nathalie Etzensperger and Gabrielle Magnenat

Pierra Menta 

 2006: 3rd, together with Catherine Mabillard
 2008: 3rd, together with Gabrielle Magnenat
 2009: 2nd, together with Gabrielle Magnenat
 2012: 2nd, together with Laëtitia Roux

Running 
 2010:
 2nd (F30), Matterhorn run
 3rd, Iron-Terrific, Crans-Montana

External links 
 Séverine Pont at skimountaineering.org
 Séverine Pont - personal website

References 

1979 births
Living people
Swiss female ski mountaineers
World ski mountaineering champions
Swiss female long-distance runners
Sportspeople from the canton of Geneva